Fabtek Inc. was a thriving video kit company founded in Bellevue, Washington, United States and started its operations there in 1987. Fabtek's name was derived from the initials of its founder Frank Ballouz (F.A.B.-tek), a former Atari and Nintendo of America executive who later also founded Irem America. Fabtek was known for licensing arcade games mostly from two manufacturers for distribution: Seibu Kaihatsu and TAD Corporation. Around 1990, Fabtek moved to Redmond, Washington and continued its business there until closing its business in 1999.

The Fabtek Inc. also worked, alongside Source Research & Development and Montague-Weston, on the "Workboy" a Game Boy accessory that could transform the Game Boy in to a portable workstation, which was planned for a summer 1992 release, but never materialized.

List of games distributed by Fabtek

Licensed from Seibu Kaihatsu
 Dead Angle (1988)
 Dynamite Duke (1989)
 Raiden (1990)
 Seibu Cup Soccer (1992)
 Zero Team USA (1993)
 Raiden II (1993)
 Raiden DX (1994)
 Viper Phase 1 (1995)
 Battle Balls (1996)
 Raiden Fighters (1996)
 Raiden Fighters 2: Operation Hell Dive (1997)
 Raiden Fighters Jet (1998)

Licensed from TAD Corporation
 Cabal (1988)
 Toki (1989)
 Blood Bros. (1990)
 Legionnaire (1992)
 Heated Barrel (1992)

Other
 Sports Match (1989) (produced by Dynax)
 Super Space Fortress Macross (1992) (produced by Banpresto)
 Jungle Joggers (redemption game) (1992)
 Super Mario World (redemption game) (1993) (licensed by Nintendo)
 Gotcha Gotcha (1997) (produced by Dongsung Wonder Park and Para)

References

External links
List of Fabtek games at GameFAQs

Defunct video game companies of the United States
Video game companies established in 1987
Video game publishers
Companies based in Bellevue, Washington